The 2011 Black-Eyed Susan Stakes was the 87th running of the Black-Eyed Susan Stakes. The race took place in Baltimore, Maryland on May 14, 2011, and was televised in the United States on the NBC Sports Network. Ridden by jockey Jose Lezcano, Royal Delta won the race by two and a half lengths over runner-up Buster's Ready. Approximate post time on the Friday evening before the Preakness Stakes was 4:46 p.m. Eastern Time and the race was run for a purse of $300,000. The race was run over a fast track in a final time of 1:49.60. The Maryland Jockey Club reported total attendance of 27,966. The attendance at Pimlico Race Course that day was a record crowd for Black-Eyed Susan Stakes Day.

Payout 

The 87th Black-Eyed Susan Stakes Payout Schedule

$2 Exacta:  (1–5) paid   $34.20

$2 Trifecta:  (1–5–2) paid   $106.00

$1 Superfecta:  (1–5–2–6) paid   $77.30

The full chart 

 Winning Breeder: Colts Neck Stables; (KY)  
 Final Time: 1:49.60
 Track Condition: Fast
 Total Attendance: 32,473

See also 
 2011 Preakness Stakes
 Black-Eyed Susan Stakes Stakes "top three finishers" and # of starters

References

External links 
 Official Black-Eyed Susan Stakes website
 Official Preakness website

2011 in horse racing
Horse races in Maryland
2011 in American sports
2011 in sports in Maryland
Black-Eyed Susan Stakes